"Teenage Heaven" is a 1959 song by Eddie Cochran and Jerry Capehart. It was the A-side of Liberty F-55177 and was featured in the movie Go, Johnny Go! The single rose to number 99 on the Billboard charts. The B-side "I Remember" was also recorded and filmed for the movie but was left out.

Personnel
 Eddie Cochran: vocal, guitar
 Don Myers: electric bass
 Gene Riggio: drums
 Jim Stivers: piano
 Plas Johnson: tenor saxophone
 according to Tony Scherman's biography of Earl Palmer, he was the drummer on this session.

Chart performance

References

External links
Eddie Cochran US discography on Remember Eddie Cochran

1959 singles
Eddie Cochran songs
Songs written by Eddie Cochran
Songs written by Jerry Capehart
Liberty Records singles
1959 songs